The Sounti (also spelled as Saunti) are an Indo-Aryan ethnic group found mainly in the districts of Kendujhar and Mayurbhanj, Odisha . The 2011 census showed their population to be around 112,803. They are classified as a Scheduled Tribe by the Indian government.

History
According to the Mayurbhanj State, Census Report of 1931,  the Sounti caste originated in 17th century by one Joygobinda Das of Puri. The same Census reported that he came to Kendujhar from Puri in 1603 C.E. . He was allowed to settle in Mananta village  in Kendujhar. After renouncing his caste, he is said to have formed this new caste . The new caste formed around people made outcast from other castes who were allowed by the ruler of Kendujhar state to settle in Mananta. Their numbers grew over time as they readily accepted other outcasts. The caste name was literally "gathered in" in Odia thus pointing to their origins where they gathered in the other outcasts. The Scheduled Castes and the Scheduled Tribes Lists (Modification) Order, 1956 refers to them as Sounti. Census of Mayurbhanj, 1931 mentions them as Saunti. Some of the members due to their inability to pronounce the word properly call themselves as Samuli or Samti.

Demography

According to 2011 census , the sounti population is 112803 with a sex ratio of 1023. Their literacy rate is 59.58%. Most of the sounti speak a dialect of Odia.

Culture 

Sounti society follow Hinduism , worship Hindu gods and goddesses and observe some of the Hindu festivals and rituals. However they have some animist beliefs as well. They worship village deities like Thakurani and Mangala and other Hindu deities like Siva and Raghunath. They have a traditional priest called Dehury.

The Sounti settlement are traditionally homogeneous, however they are divided into a number of exogamous clans called Khilli including Bardia, Saru and Tangsaria F amily structure is patrilineal and patrilocal and monogamous. Polygyne is present but uncommon. Marriages are done by negotiation. Groom pays a negotiated amount for marriage called  bride price and it is obligatory. Remarriage of widows, widowers, divorcees are permissible. Junior Levirate marriage and Sororate marriage practices are allowed. After a birth of a child the family observes Birth pollution for twenty one days. On death of a member of community , cremation and burial are both practised. The bereaved family observes death pollution for ten days.

They live in multi-ethnic villages but maintain separate hamlets from other groups. Single ethnic Sounti villages are uncommon. They live mostly in small houses with two rooms with spacious verandahs in the front. Cattle shed and shed for de-husking rice are built close to the house. Stringed Charpoys and mats made of date-palm leaves, Bell-metal and aluminium utensils are most common household goods.

Men use dhoti. Women wear saree. Financially well off section of the community use undergarments otherwise it is rare. Tattooing is not popular.

The Sounti have their own traditional community council headed by village chief and influential elders. It settles family disputes and acts as guardian of traditional norms and customs.

The main source of income in the Sounti society is farming , livestock rearing and forestry.  Many Sountis work as farm labourers .

References

Scheduled Tribes of India
Social groups of Odisha
Scheduled Tribes of Odisha